Patrick de Barros (born 3 February 1945) is a Portuguese sailor. He competed in the Star event at the 1988 Summer Olympics.

References

External links
 

1945 births
Living people
Portuguese male sailors (sport)
Olympic sailors of Portugal
Sailors at the 1988 Summer Olympics – Star
Place of birth missing (living people)